David Adams (born 5 January 1957) is an Australian former rugby league footballer.

Background
David Adams was born in Sydney, New South Wales, Australia.

References

External links
Rugby League Project stats

1957 births
Australian rugby league players
Balmain Tigers players
Living people
Manly Warringah Sea Eagles players
Rugby league players from Sydney
Scone Thoroughbreds players
Rugby league articles needing expert attention